"Dio, come ti amo" (English translation: "God, How I Love You") is a song which was first performed as duo by Domenico Modugno and Gigliola Cinquetti at the Sanremo Music Festival 1966. By winning the competition, it was chosen as the  entry in the Eurovision Song Contest 1966, and performed in Italian by Modugno.  It was also the title of an Italian Musicarello (Italian musical) released in 1966.  The Singer was the main star, accompanied by Mark Damon, and actors from the Italian Stable Raimondo Vianello and Nino Taranto.  It was in black and White.

The song is a ballad, in which Modugno tells his lover how he feels about her. He expresses his amazement at the depth of his own feelings, with the title phrase being used frequently.

At Eurovison 
The song was performed fourteenth on the night (following 's Téréza with "Bien plus fort" and preceding 's Dominique Walter with "Chez nous"). At the close of voting, it had received nul points (zero), for the first and also the only time in Italian Eurovision history, placing 17th (equal last) in a field of 18.

Due to the song becoming a solo performance, rather than a duet, it had been rearranged since its performance at the Sanremo Music Festival. However, this broke the EBU rules stating that the arrangement should be finalised well in advance. During rehearsals mere hours before the final, Modugno performed the new arrangement with three of his own musicians as opposed to the orchestra, which went over the three minute time limit set by the rules of the contest. Following his rehearsal, Modugno was confronted by the show's producers about exceeding the time limit and was asked to use the original arrangement with the orchestra. Modugno was so dissatisfied with the orchestra that he threatened to withdraw from the contest. Both the producers and EBU scrutineer Clifford Brown felt it was too short notice to fly Gigliola Cinquetti to Luxembourg to represent Italy, so the EBU gave in and allowed Modugno to use his own ensemble instead of the orchestra. Despite websites and the official programme listing  as the conductor, Giacomazzi actually played the piano for the entry.

It was succeeded as Italian representative at the 1967 contest by Claudio Villa with "Non andare più lontano".

Recordings
 Sergio Franchi recorded an English/Italian version titled "Oh How Much I Love You (Dio, come ti amo!)" in 1967 on his RCA Victor album From Sergio – With Love.
 Shirley Bassey recorded a version of the song titled "Dio, come ti amo (Oh God How Much I Love You)" for her 1991 album Keep the Music Playing.
 Spanish performer Vega recorded the song in 2017 accompanied by Elvis Costello. Both sang it in the original Italian.

Charts

References

Eurovision songs of Italy
Eurovision songs of 1966
Domenico Modugno songs
Gigliola Cinquetti songs
Shirley Bassey songs
Eurovision songs that scored no points
Sanremo Music Festival songs
Number-one singles in Italy
Songs written by Domenico Modugno
1966 songs